Nairn Castle was a castle that was located in Nairn, Scotland. Nairn, then known as Invernairn, was made a royal burgh by King Alexander I of Scotland. The site of the castle is still being debated and it is unclear as to whether any aboveground remains exist.

References

Further reading
 
 Bain, George: "History of Nairnshire" (1893)
Coventry, M. (2008) Castles of the Clans: the strongholds and seats of 750 Scottish families and clans. Musselburgh.
Gifford, J. (1992) Highland and Islands, The buildings of Scotland series. London.
Shaw, L. (1882) The history of the province of Moray: comprising the counties of Elgin and Nairn, the greater part of the County of Inverness, and a portion of the County of Banff - all called the Province of Moray before there was a division into counties, 3v. London; Glasgow.

 

Castles in Highland (council area)
Ruined castles in Highland (council area)
Demolished buildings and structures in Scotland
Former castles in Scotland